Telephone numbers in the Faroe Islands have used a closed numbering plan, with 6-digit subscriber's numbers since 1998.  Numbers are usually printed in three groups of two digits.  E.g. Tórshavn municipality's city hall has the telephone number 30 20 10.

Unusually for countries in Europe, the Faroe Islands were assigned the country calling code by the International Telecommunication Union beginning with the digit "2", in common with countries in Africa. At the time, however, all country codes beginning with "3" and "4", reserved for countries in Europe, were already in use. Originally, telephone numbers in the Faroe Islands could be reached using the country code for Denmark, +45, followed by the area code 42. 

Calls to Denmark require the use of the international access code 00 and country code 45; previously, only the digit 0 was required before the subscriber's eight-digit number, with calls to the rest of the world using the international access code 009 and the country code.

Allocations

Special Numbers

References

Faroe Islands
Faroe Islands communications-related lists
Communications in the Faroe Islands